John Francis McGrath (1 September 1893 – 20 December 1971) was an Australian politician and a member of the New South Wales Legislative Assembly from 1941 until 1959. He was a member of the NSW Branch of the Australian Labor Party and held a number of ministerial positions including Minister for Housing.

Early life and career
McGrath was born in Chicago, the son of a publican and migrated with his family to Australia at age nine. He was educated at St Aloysius' College and initially worked as an electrician. He became an official of the Electrical Trades Union but left the industry to become a hotel owner. After owning several hotels, including losing one in Rockdale during the Great Depression, McGrath leased the Bexley Hotel and became a proprietor of other hotels in the Bexley area. McGrath was soon active in community organisations, becoming president of Bexley Chamber of Commerce from 1936 until 1970. McGrath was elected as an alderman on the Bexley Municipal Council at a by-election in 1937, and served until 1944. He was the deputy mayor for three terms in 1938–1941 and served as a Bexley delegate on the St George County Council.

Political career
McGrath was the defeated ALP candidate at the 1939 by-election for the seat of Hurstville which was won by Clive Evatt of the Industrial Labor Party. He was eventually elected to the New South Wales parliament as the Labor member for new seat of Rockdale at the 1941 election. He retained the seat for the next five elections and retired at the 1959 election. In 1947, he was elected Government Whip and served until his promotion to the cabinet in 1953.

McGrath held ministerial positions in the government of Joseph Cahill. He was a Minister without portfolio in 1953, and was appointed the Minister for Housing in 1954 and the Secretary for Public Works from 1956 until his retirement. In this role he was responsible for the early construction work on the Sydney Opera House.

References

 

1893 births
1971 deaths
People educated at St Aloysius' College (Sydney)
Members of the New South Wales Legislative Assembly
Australian Labor Party members of the Parliament of New South Wales
20th-century Australian politicians
New South Wales local councillors
Australian electricians
Australian hoteliers
Australian people of Irish descent
American emigrants to Australia
Burials at Waverley Cemetery